Russomanno is a surname. Notable people with the surname include:

Celso Russomanno (born 1956), Brazilian reporter and politician
Conor Russomanno (born 1988), American entrepreneur, creative technologist, and lecturer